This is a list of electoral divisions and wards in the ceremonial county of Cornwall in South West England. All changes since the re-organisation of local government following the passing of the Local Government Act 1972 are shown. The number of councillors elected for each electoral division or ward is shown in brackets.

Cornwall County Council

1974-1985
Electoral Divisions from 1 April 1974 (first election 12 April 1973) to 2 May 1985:

1985-2005
Electoral Divisions from 2 May 1985 to 5 May 2005:

2005-2013
Electoral Divisions from 5 May 2005 to 2 May 2013:

Cornwall Council

2009-2013
Electoral divisions from 4 June 2009 to 2 May 2013:

2013-2021

Electoral Divisions from 2 May 2013 to 6 May 2021:

2021-present
Electoral divisions from 6 May 2021 to present:

Council of the Isles of Scilly
Wards from 7 May 1981 to present:

Former district councils

Caradon
Wards from 1 April 1974 (first election 7 June 1973) to 5 May 1983:

Wards from 5 May 1983 to 1 May 2003:

Wards from 1 May 2003 to 1 April 2009 (district abolished):

Carrick
Wards from 1 April 1974 (first election 7 June 1973) to 3 May 1979:

Wards from 3 May 1979 to 1 May 2003:

Wards from 1 May 2003 to 1 April 2009 (district abolished):

Kerrier
Wards from 1 April 1974 (first election 7 June 1973) to 3 May 1979:

Wards from 3 May 1979 to 1 May 2003:

Wards from 1 May 2003 to 1 April 2009 (district abolished):

North Cornwall
Wards from 1 April 1974 (first election 7 June 1973) to 3 May 1979:

Wards from 3 May 1979 to 1 May 2003:

Wards from 1 May 2003 to 1 April 2009 (district abolished):

Penwith
Wards from 1 April 1974 (first election 7 June 1973) to 3 May 1979:

Wards from 3 May 1979 to 10 June 2004:

Wards from 10 June 2004 to 1 April 2009 (district abolished):

Restormel
Wards from 1 April 1974 (first election 7 June 1973) to 5 May 1983:

Wards from 5 May 1983 to 1 May 2003:

Wards from 1 May 2003 to 1 April 2009 (district abolished):

Electoral wards by constituency

This list relates to the now defunct Electoral Wards - not the current Electoral Divisions.

Camborne and Redruth
Camborne North, Camborne South, Camborne West, Constantine, Gweek and Mawnan, Gwinear, Gwithian and Hayle East, Hayle North, Hayle South, Illogan North, Illogan South, Mabe and Budock, Mount Hawke, Redruth North, Redruth South, St Day, Lanner and Carharrack, Stithians, Wendron.

North Cornwall
Allan, Altarnun, Blisland and St Breward, Bodmin St Mary’s, Bodmin St Petroc, Bude, Camelford, Camelot, Grenville, Lanivet, Launceston, Marhamchurch, North Petherwin, Padstow and District, Poughill and Stratton, St Endellion and St Kew, St Minver, South Petherwin, Stokeclimsland, Tremaine, Valency, Wadebridge, Week St Mary and Whitstone.

South East Cornwall
Callington, Calstock, Deviock and Sheviock, Dobwalls and District, Duloe, Lansallos and Pelynt, Landrake and St Dominick, Lanteglos and St Veep, Liskeard North, Liskeard South, Looe and St Martin, Lynher, Menheniot and St Ive, Millbrook, Rame Peninsula, St Cleer and St Neot, St Germans, Saltash Burraton, Saltash Essa, Saltash Pill, Saltash St Stephens, Torpoint East, Torpoint West.

St Austell and Newquay
Bethel, Crinnis, Edgcumbe North, Edgcumbe South, Fowey and Tywardreath, Gannel, Gover, Mevagissey, Mount Charles, Poltair, Rialton, Rock, St Blaise, St Columb, St Enoder, St Ewe, St Stephen, Treverbyn.

St Ives
Breage and Crowan, Goldsithney, Grade-Ruan and Landewednack, Gulval and Heamoor, Helston North, Helston South, Lelant and Carbis Bay, Ludgvan and Towednack, Madron and Zennor, Marazion and Perranuthnoe, Meneage, Morvah, Mullion, Pendeen and St Just, Penzance Central, Penzance East, Penzance Promenade, Penzance South, Porthleven and Sithney, St Buryan, St Erth and St Hilary, St Ives North, St Ives South St Keverne, the Isles of Scilly (Bryher, St Agnes, St Martin's, St Mary's, Tresco).

Truro and Falmouth
Arwenack, Boscawen, Boslowick, Carland, Feock and Kea, Kenwyn and Chacewater, Moresk, Mylor, Newlyn and Goonhavern, Penryn, Penwerris, Perranporth, Probus, Roseland, St Agnes, Tregolls, Trehaverne and Gloweth, Trescobeas.

See also

List of parliamentary constituencies in Cornwall

References

Politics of Cornwall
Cornwall
Wards